Brink is a ghost town in Greenbrier County, West Virginia, United States. Brink appeared on USGS maps as late as 1923.

The town was founded by Brinkley M. Snodgrass in 1865–66. An abandoned house and church near Loopemount are all that remain of the settlement.

References

Geography of Greenbrier County, West Virginia
Ghost towns in West Virginia